Kamsa was the tyrant ruler of the Vrishni kingdom, with its capital at Mathura. He is variously described in Hindu literature as either a human or an asura; The Puranas describe him as an asura,  while the Harivamśa describes him as an asura reborn in the body of a man. His royal house was called Bhoja; thus, another of his names was Bhojapati. He was the cousin of Devaki, the mother of the deity Krishna; Krishna ultimately fulfilled a prophecy by slaying Kamsa.

Kamsa was born to King Ugrasena and Queen Padmavati. However, out of ambition, and upon the advice of his personal confidantes, Banasura and Narakasura, Kamsa decided to overthrow his father, and install himself as the King of Mathura. Therefore, upon the guidance of another advisor, Chanura, Kamsa decided to marry Asti and Prapti, the daughters of Jarasandha, King of Magadha.

After a heavenly voice prophesied that Devaki's eighth son would slay him, Kamsa imprisoned Devaki and her husband Vasudeva, and killed all of their children; however, just before the birth of the seventh child of Devaki and Vasudeva, Vishnu ordered the goddess Mahamaya to transfer the child from the womb of Devaki to that of Rohini, another wife of Vasudeva. Soon, Rohini gave birth to Devaki's seventh son, named Balarama. The eighth son, Krishna, an avatar of Vishnu, was transported to the village of Gokula, where he was raised in the care of Nanda, the head of the cowherds. Learning of his birth, Kamsa sent a host of asuras to kill the child Krishna, but Krishna killed every one of them. Finally, Krishna arrived in Mathura and slew his uncle, Kamsa.

Birth and early life
Kamsa was, in his previous birth, a demon called Kalanemi, who was slain by the god Vishnu. Kamsa is generally described as the son of the Yadava ruler, Ugrasena. However, some texts such as the Padma Purana state that Kamsa was not the biological son of Ugrasena. In this story, the wife of Ugrasena (named Padmavati in some texts) is seen by a supernatural being named Dramila, who transforms himself into the form of Ugrasena and inseminated her. Realizing that he was not Ugrasena, Padmavati curses Drumila to hell for his sin. She soon becomes pregnant with a son, whom she also curses be killed by a member of his family. After the son is born, Ugrasena adopts him and names him Kamsa.

In childhood, Kamsa was trained by the other Yadavas, who were famous warriors, along with his eight brothers. Kamsa acquired Jarasandha's attention when the latter tried to invade Mathura. Kamsa single-handedly routed Jarasandha's army. The latter was impressed and made Kamsa his son-in-law. With Jarasandha's support, Kamsa became even more powerful.

Annexation of kingdom 

During his wedding in Mathura, Jarasandha brought over his army to escort the Princesses Asti and Prapti. Using the army of Magadha as his political cover, Kamsa overthrew his father after he refused to voluntarily retire from his position. This was done within the confines of the royal palace and the public was not informed. After Ugrasena failed to show up for public events, Kamsa announced his coronation.

Warning issued by Yogamaya

In a prophecy, Kamsa was told that the eighth child of Devaki would kill him. Hearing that, he wanted to kill Devaki, but Vasudeva managed to save her life by promising Kamsa that he (Vasudeva) himself would deliver all their children to Kamsa. Kamsa accepted that promise and spared Devaki because she herself was not a threat to him. In the confines of the prison, Devaki repeatedly conceived and Kamsa cruelly murdered the first six children.

Just before the seventh child was born, Lord Vishnu ordered Goddess Mahamaya (beautiful goddess and the controller of Maya) to place the seventh child of Devaki in the womb of Rohini. Thus, facilitating God Sesha's descent or avatar, the seventh child was raised by surrogate mother, Rohini, and was named Balarama, Shri Krishna's elder brother. Whereas Lord Vishnu Himself, was soon to appear as the eighth son of Devaki, he ordered Yogamaya to take birth from the womb of Yashoda. Facilitating Lord Vishnu's descent or avatar, Yogamaya (the controller of the darkness and ignorance) had put the guards of Kamsa to sleep or in a state of trance. At that time also, Vasudeva, obeying Shri Hari's order, took infant Krishna to Nanda and Yashoda's house, bringing back the baby girl, Yogamaya. Presuming this baby as Devaki's eighth child, Kamsa was about to kill her by slamming her down on the ground, but the girl slipped out of his hands. Taking her cosmic form, Yogamaya warned Kamsa, "The eighth child, who shall kill you, has been born. He is in Gokula!"

Death 

The seventh child, Balarama, was saved when he was moved to Rohini's womb. The eighth child born to Devaki and Vasudeva was Krishna. Krishna was saved from Kamsa's wrath and raised by Vasudeva's relative Nanda and Yasoda, a cowherd couple.

After Krishna grew up and returned to the kingdom, Kamsa was eventually killed and beheaded by Krishna, as was originally predicted by the divine prophecy. His eight brothers, headed by Kanka, were also killed by Balarama. Following this, Ugrasena was reinstated as the King of Mathura.

References

External links 

 Why was Krsna’s Uncle Kamsa a Demon? The mystery of Kamsa’s birth revealed.

People related to Krishna
Characters in the Mahabharata
Characters in the Bhagavata Purana